John William Coddington (born 16 December 1937, in Worksop) is a former professional footballer who played as a centre half in the Football League for Huddersfield Town, Blackburn Rovers and Stockport County. He played most of his career with Huddersfield Town, spending 14 years at Leeds Road between 1953 and 1967, before joining Blackburn Rovers and then Stockport County.

Coddington along with ex Huddersfield player Les Massie signed for Drogheda United in January 1973 and made his League of Ireland debut on 4 February at Lourdes Stadium .

He later worked as a coach at Bradford City and Middlesbrough.

Personal life
Coddington's grandson, Luke, also became a professional footballer, playing as a goalkeeper.

References

External links
 

1937 births
Living people
Footballers from Worksop
English footballers
Association football defenders
Huddersfield Town A.F.C. players
Blackburn Rovers F.C. players
Stockport County F.C. players
English Football League players
Great Harwood Town F.C. players
Drogheda United F.C. players
League of Ireland players